The heats for the Men's 200 metre Individual Medley race at the 2009 World Championships took place in the morning and evening of 29 July and the final took place in the evening session of 30 July at the Foro Italico in Rome, Italy. The order of swimming in the medley was butterfly, backstroke, breaststroke, freestyle.

Records
Prior to this competition, the existing world and competition records were as follows:

The following records were established during the competition:

Results

Heats

Semifinals

Final

See also
Swimming at the 2007 World Aquatics Championships – Men's 200 metre individual medley
Swimming at the 2008 Summer Olympics – Men's 200 metre individual medley

External links
Worlds 2009 results: Men's 200m IM Heats, from OmegaTiming.com (official timer of the 2009 Worlds).
Worlds 2009 results: Men's 200m IM Semis, from OmegaTiming.com (official timer of the 2009 Worlds).
Final Results

Individual medley Men 200